('Thorbjörg little-völva;  CE) was a renowned seeress (völva) in Norse colonial Greenland during the late Viking Age. She is featured in the Saga of Erik the Red and her description is the most detailed presentation of seeress behavior, associated customs, and material culture – such as her distinctive clothing and use of a wand – found in the sagas of Icelanders.

Saga of Erik the Red
According to the saga, times were tough in Greenland; hunters caught few animals, and some simply didn’t return at all. In the Norse settlement lived a seeress by the name of Þorbjörg, called the lítilvölva (meaning 'little (or lesser) seeress'). She had nine sisters, all of whom held the gift of prophecy, but Þorbjörg had outlived them all.

Every winter, Þorbjörg visited each farm to which she was invited in the district. She regularly received invitations from those who wanted to know their future, or the future of their farms. One winter, Þorkel, a major farmer, invited Þorbjörg to his farm, and he and his family began making preparations for her arrival:

After the tables were cleared, Þorkel asked Þorbjörg what she thought of the estate and the household's conduct, and how soon he could expect a response to his questions about the future, as everyone was eager to know. Þorbjörg said she would not provide a response until having spent a night at the farm.

Late the next day, people at the farmstead provided her with "things she required to carry out her magic rites." Þorbjörg asked if any woman present knew varðlokkur (Old Norse 'ward enticers, ward songs'), chants necessary to carry out magic rites. No woman present knew the charms. The people of the household asked around the settlement until a woman named Gudrid (introduced earlier in the saga) responded that, "I have neither magical powers nor the gift of prophecy, but in Iceland my foster-mother, Halldis, taught me chants she called ward songs".

Þorbjörg responded that this was more than she expected. Gudrid, however, says that because she is a Christian woman, she intends to take no part in the seeress's activities. Þorbjörg, undaunted, says, "It could be that you could help the people by so doing, and you'd be no worse a woman for that. But I expect Thorkel to provide me with what I need."

Þorkel urged Gudrid to assist the seeress, and she agreed. Together the women "formed a warding ring around the platform raised for sorcery, with Þorbjörg perched atop it." Gudrid successfully sang the chants, impressing those in attendance with the beauty of her voice.

Þorbjörg thanked Gudrid for her assistance, and said that earlier the spirits refused to do her bidding, but that the spirits had been attracted to Gudrid's beautiful voice. The seeress said that she can now see clearly into the future, and that the hardships the farmers faced would clear up as spring arrives, and that the sickness that plagued the people there would also soon improve. For her help, the seeress provided special insight for Gudrid, predicting her future, and wished her well.

The ceremony over, farmers approached the seeress to learn what was in store for them. The saga informs the reader that she provided answers for them, and that "little that she predicted did not occur". After, a retinue arrived to escort her to another farm.

Scholarly reception
According to philologist and religious studies scholar Rudolf Simek, Saga of Erik the Red may be an embellished literary narrative but details regarding the seeress, such as the high seat, staff, and the circle derive from historical practices in Germanic paganism.

See also
 Séance

Notes

References
Kurz, Keneva. 2000. "Eirik the Red's Saga" (trans.) in The Sagas of Icelanders, pp. 653-674. Penguin Classics. 
Sephton, John. 1880. Eirik the Red's Saga: A Translation. D. Marples. Online.
Simek, Rudolf. 2007 [1993]. Dictionary of Northern Mythology. Boydell & Brewer Ltd. 

Germanic seeresses
10th-century Icelandic women